Maryland House of Delegates District 43 is one of 47 legislative districts in the state of Maryland and one of the 5 located entirely within Baltimore City. The neighborhoods of Abell, Cedarcroft, Charles Village, Coldstream-Homestead-Montebello, Ednor Gardens-Lakeside, Guilford, Homeland, Hillen, Lake Evesham, Lauraville, Mid-Govans,  Northwood, Pen Lucy, Radnor-Winston, Ramblewood, Stonewood-Pentwood-Winston, Tuscany-Canterbury, Waverly, Wilson Park and Woodbourne Heights, Baltimore make up the majority of the district. The district is divided into two sub-districts for the Maryland House of Delegates: District 43A and District 43B.

Demographic characteristics
As of the 2020 United States census, the district had a population of 109,154, of whom 90,503 (82.9%) were of voting age. The racial makeup of the district was 29,325 (26.9%) White, 64,733 (59.3%) African American, 242 (0.2%) Native American, 6,646 (6.1%) Asian, 26 (0.0%) Pacific Islander, 2,220 (2.0%) from some other race, and 5,947 (5.4%) from two or more races. Hispanic or Latino of any race were 4,873 (4.5%) of the population.

The district had 77,644 registered voters as of October 17, 2020, of whom 9,308 (12.0%) were registered as unaffiliated, 4,222 (5.4%) were registered as Republicans, 63,099 (81.3%) were registered as Democrats, and 541 (0.7%) were registered to other parties.

Educational institutions

Universities
Several of Maryland's larger institutions of higher education are located within the 43rd district. With the district being redrawn in 2012 per the 2010 census, most of the Johns Hopkins University Homewood campus is in the 43rd.  The district also includes Morgan State University, Loyola University Maryland and the Notre Dame of Maryland University.

High schools
The 43rd district is also home to Baltimore City College, the oldest high school in Maryland. Other high schools in the district include: W. E. B. Du Bois High School, Mergenthaler Vocational-Technical High School, Reginald F. Lewis High School and the Baltimore Career Academy.

Elected representatives
The district is represented for the 2023–2027 legislative term in the State Senate by Mary L. Washington (D) and in the House of Delegates by Elizabeth Embry (D, District 43A), Regina T. Boyce (D, District 43A), and Cathi Forbes (D, District 43B).

Election results

References

Baltimore
43